Penicillium dunedinense is a species of the genus of Penicillium which was isolated in Dunedin in New Zealand.

See also
 List of Penicillium species

References 

dunedinense
Fungi described in 2014